The golden-backed whistler (Pachycephala aurea) or yellow-backed whistler, is a species of bird in the family Pachycephalidae.
It is found throughout New Guinea.

References

golden-backed whistler
Endemic fauna of New Guinea
Birds of New Guinea
golden-backed whistler
Taxonomy articles created by Polbot